Traductorado, or, as it is formally known, Instituto Superior del Traductorado, is a translation school in La Plata, Buenos Aires, Argentina.

It was founded on 16 April 1995 in the city of La Plata, Buenos Aires, Argentina. Traductorado was initially a Translation and Research Department of the New Oxford Institute, which advocated the creation of an official translation degree course in the Province of Buenos Aires.

On 24 October 1996, in reply to a first draft outlined by the Traductorado team, the Department of Education (Dirección General de Cultura y Educación) summoned a group of New Oxford experts, headed by linguist, translator and professor Hugo Torres, to write the definitive syllabus for the first official translation degree course in the history of the Province of Buenos Aires.

The new degree course was implemented the following year in a monitored experience whose outstanding results earned Traductorado the status of first and only college of higher education in the country, specialized in the professional formation of technical-scientific English-Spanish translators.

Some of the innovative features that characterized the Official Degree Course were all subjects delivered in English, a compact timetable, a flexible syllabus, tutorials and permanent assessment of the learning process.

In 1998 the quality of the degree course impelled the Committee of Degrees Classification of the Department of Education (Tribunal de Clasificaciones de la Dirección de Cultura y Educación) to extend the working field of Traductorado's graduate translators to the teaching of English in schools.

The creation of the 'Argentine Association of Technical-Scientific Translators' (AATT) in the year 2000 was a landmark in the history of the Instituto Superior del Traductorado. AATT gathers all graduate translators in a common body, and keeps the register of practising technical-scientific translators giving cohesion to the profession.

AATT is also in charge of the international Translation Skills Examinations (TSE) which are free, supplementary English tests offered to EGB and polimodal schools. These international examinations have become an articulation between the primary and secondary levels of official education and the Instituto Superior del Traductorado.

External links
 Instituto Superior del Traductorado

This article contains material from Traductorado.edu.ar that has authorized its publication under GFDL.

La Plata
Translation and interpreting schools
Universities in Argentina